Kryzhanovsky may refer to:

People with the surname 

 Anton Kryzhanovsky, Russian intersex activist
 Adam Krijanovski, mayor of Chișinău from 1867 to 1869
 Oleg Leonidovich Kryzhanovsky, Russian entomologist who specialised in Coleoptera
 Viktor Kryzhanivsky, Ukrainian diplomat